Cincinnati Country Day School (abbreviated CCDS) is a private, coeducational, independent school located in Indian Hill, Ohio, a suburb of Cincinnati.

History 
Cincinnati Country Day School was founded in 1926 and was inspired by the Country Day School movement, which had started in Baltimore 20 years earlier.  The school sits on a  campus in Indian Hill, Ohio. Starting in the fall of 1996, students 5th grade and above were equipped with laptop computers as part of the "Anytime Anywhere Learning" program.

Academics 
The school enrolls approximately 850 students from early childhood through high school (with a maximum of 75 per grade level). There are approximately 350 students in the lower school (grades PreK-4), 200 in the middle school (grades 5–8), and 300 in the upper school (grades 9-12).

Polaris ranked Country Day the #1 school in Cincinnati for sending students to Harvard, Princeton, and MIT. In 2021, niche.com ranked Country Day as a top Cincinnati area College Prep School, Private High School, Best School, Most Diverse School, and having the Best Teachers.

Each year, 100% of graduating seniors attend four-year colleges. Fifteen percent of the class of 2021 was National Merit recognized. In 2020, 103 students in the middle and upper schools received gold, silver, bronze, and platinum status on the National French Contest and the National Spanish Exam. The school sits on a  campus in Indian Hill, Ohio.  The school newspaper, called The Scroll (www.scrollonline.net) is part of the National Scholastic Press Association.

For the 2021–22 school year, tuition ranged from $7,570 (for limited early childhood care) to $27,730 (for students grades 10–12)

Athletics
Cincinnati Country Day fields 53 teams in 15 sports, with 22 varsity teams. The school is accredited by the Ohio High School Athletic Association and participates in the Miami Valley Conference.

OHSAA State Championships
 Boys Baseball - 1993, 2001
 Boys Lacrosse - 2001, 2005 (Ohio High School Lacrosse Association)
 Boys Tennis - 2014, 2015
 Girls Soccer - 2018, 2019, 2022

 As of 2022, CCD has won 27 Individual State Championships (14 Boys Tennis, 8 Track & Field, 4 Swimming, 1 Golf)

Non-OHSAA Championships
 Rowing - Six National Championship Appearances, Four National Championships

Facilities
The 62-acre campus includes the following amenities:
 Early Childhood Center
 Four playgrounds
 Outdoor playscape and education area, including mini ponies, donkey, rabbit, and chickens
 Outdoor performing arts area and amphitheater
 Two libraries
 Three Makerspaces
 540-seat theater
 State-of-the-art science laboratories and telescope 
 Visual arts studio with darkroom and digital imaging area
 Conference and meeting spaces
 Wireless campus and classrooms
 Two full-sized gymnasiums
 Six-lane swimming pool
 Seven athletic playing fields
 Athletic Center
 Track
 Seven tennis courts and pavilion

Notable alumni
 Aaron Dessner, co-founder of The National
 Bryce Dessner, co-founder of The National
 David Freiberg, member of Quicksilver Messenger Service, Jefferson Airplane, and Jefferson Starship
 Jeannine Hall Gailey, poet
 Joe Hagin, former White House Deputy Chief of Staff
 Jeffrey Harrison, poet
 Sarah Herrlinger, senior director of global accessibility policy & initiatives at Apple
 Michael Hill, senior vice president of on-field operations for Major League Baseball
 Harry Jackson, Evangelical Christian social conservative leader
 Ashley Kahn, music historian, journalist, and producer
 Alan Light, journalist and critic
 Hema Magge, senior program officer at the Bill & Melinda Gates Foundation
 David Pepper, former chairman of the Ohio Democratic Party
 Kellen Pomeranz, Grammy Award-winning songwriter and producer
 Rob Portman, U.S. Senator from Ohio; former Director of the Office of Management and Budget, U.S. Trade Representative, and member of the United States House of Representatives
 Robert Shetterly, artist
 John Simon, president, Lehigh University
 Veena Sud, TV writer and producer
 Bob Taft, former Governor of Ohio and Ohio Secretary of State
 William H. Wood, inventor and pioneer in global interpretation services
 J.J. Wolf, professional tennis player

References

External links 
 
 The Scroll, the school's newspaper

Indian Hill, Ohio
Educational institutions established in 1926
High schools in Hamilton County, Ohio
Private high schools in Ohio
Private middle schools in Ohio
Private elementary schools in Ohio
1926 establishments in Ohio